Cachoeiro de Itapemirim (local ) is a municipality and a major town, located in the south of Espírito Santo, Brazil, on the banks of the Itapemirim River. It is the economic hub of southern Espírito Santo, being the most important producer of marble and granite in Brazil. Home to one of the biggest intercity bus companies, it is a very well-connected city. The population is about 210,000. Location: 138 km south of Vitória.

The city is served by Cachoeiro de Itapemirim Airport.

History
Cachoeiro de Itapemirim's first commercial establishment opened in 1853, and in 1889 its first post office and telegram services were begun. Since its early days, transport has played a major role in this town. Since it was established by a waterfall, where it would be impossible to continue the journey up the river, it became an important stop for gold prospectors traveling to Minas Gerais. Many immigrant families which travelled to southern Espírito Santo established in the region.

Transport 
The railway line to Rio de Janeiro was completed in 1900, allowing both cultural and economical influence from the latter.  In 1911 the railway to Vitória was completed, strengthening links to the north.

Attractions

The municipality contains the  Pacotuba National Forest, created in 2002.
The quilombola community of Monte Alegre offers ethnic, cultural and environmental tourism in partnership with the forest and the ministry of tourism.
This includes crafts and gastronomy, expression of traditions and community lifestyle, and guided tours of the forest.
The municipality contains part of the protected area of the Frade e a Freira Natural Monument.
It contains the  Itabira Natural Monument.
The city is nicknamed A capital oculta do mundo, meaning "the secret capital of the world".

Notable people 
Bujica (Marcelo Ribeiro), retired professional footballer
Roberto Carlos, singer  known as The King of Brazilian Music 
Maxwell Cabelino Andrade, football player, currently playing at Paris Saint Germain 
Rubem Braga, a chronist writer
Luz del Fuego, actress, famous in the United States in the 1950s, starred on Broadway IMDB
Noemi Cavalcanti, actress IMDB
Sérgio Sampaio, actor IMDB
Raul Sampaio, actor IMDB
Carlos Imperial, actor
Charles Fricks, actor IMDB
Ramon de Morais Motta, footballer
Larissa França, professional beach volleyball player and holder of the Guinness World Record for most women’s FIVB Beach Volleyball World Tour gold medals won by an individual

References

External links 
 History and Images of Cachoeiro de Itapemirim 
 images Google Maps of Cachoeiro de Itapemirim

Municipalities in Espírito Santo